Tonkawa (YTB-786) was a United States Navy  named for Tonkawa, Oklahoma.

Construction

The contract for Tonkawa was awarded 31 January 1964. She was laid down on 22 December 1965 at Marinette, Wisconsin, by Marinette Marine and launched 15 March 1966.

Operational history
Placed in service in June 1966, Tonkawa was assigned to duty at Atlantic Area Advanced Bases, including Naval Station Rota Spain, and provided tug and tow services for the Atlantic Fleet.

Stricken from the Navy Directory in 1992, she was sold 6 October 2000 through the General Services Administration (GSA) to McAllister Towing and renamed Margaret McAllister.

References

 NavSource Online: Service Ship Photo Archive Tonkawa (YTB-786)

External links
 

Natick-class large harbor tugs
Ships built by Marinette Marine
1966 ships